Frank Curran may refer to:

Frank Curran (politician) (1912–1992), American politician
Frank Curran (English footballer) (1917–1998), footballer for Tranmere Rovers
Frank Curran (rugby league) (1910–1985), Australian rugby league footballer
Frank Curran (Australian rules footballer) (1919–1999), Australian rules footballer